The compound of five cubes is one of the five regular polyhedral compounds. It was first described by Edmund Hess in 1876.

It is one of five regular compounds, and dual to the compound of five octahedra. It can be seen as a faceting of a regular dodecahedron.

It is one of the stellations of the rhombic triacontahedron. It has icosahedral symmetry (Ih).

Geometry 

The compound is a faceting of a dodecahedron (where pentagrams can be seen correlating to the pentagonal faces). Each cube represents a selection of 8 of the 20 vertices of the dodecahedron.

If the shape is considered as a union of five cubes yielding a simple nonconvex solid without self-intersecting surfaces, then it has 360 faces (all triangles), 182 vertices (60 with degree 3, 30 with degree 4, 12 with degree 5, 60 with degree 8, and 20 with degree 12), and 540 edges, yielding an Euler characteristic of 182 − 540 + 360 = 2.

Edge arrangement 
Its convex hull is a regular dodecahedron. It additionally shares its edge arrangement with the small ditrigonal icosidodecahedron, the great ditrigonal icosidodecahedron, and the ditrigonal dodecadodecahedron. With these, it can form polyhedral compounds that can also be considered as degenerate uniform star polyhedra; the small complex rhombicosidodecahedron, great complex rhombicosidodecahedron and complex rhombidodecadodecahedron.

The compound of ten tetrahedra can be formed by taking each of these five cubes and replacing them with the two tetrahedra of the stella octangula (which share the same vertex arrangement of a cube).

As a stellation

See also

References 

. p 360
.
.
 Cundy, H. and Rollett, A. "Five Cubes in a Dodecahedron." §3.10.6 in Mathematical Models, 3rd ed. Stradbroke, England: Tarquin Pub., pp. 135–136, 1989.
 H.S.M. Coxeter, Regular Polytopes, (3rd edition, 1973), Dover edition, 3.6 The five regular compounds, pp.47-50, 6.2 Stellating the Platonic solids, pp.96-104

External links 
 MathWorld: Cube 5-Compound
 MathWorld: Rhombic Triacontahedron Stellations
 George Hart: Compounds of Cubes
 Steven Dutch: Uniform Polyhedra and Their Duals
 VRML model: 
 

Polyhedral stellation
Polyhedral compounds